The Devourers is a 2015 debut novel by Indian writer, artist, and editor Indra Das (aka Indrapramit Das). It takes place in Kolkata, India, where Das grew up, and is considered South Asian speculative fiction and dark fantasy, incorporating aspects of historical fiction, fantasy, and horror. It was originally published by Penguin India in 2015, followed by release in North America by Ballantine Del Rey of Penguin Random House in July 2016.

The novel features shape-shifters, more specifically werewolves, and explores the concepts of love, cannibalism, and what it means to be human. It is told in a multi-layered manner, alternating between different time periods and perspectives. The author's writing has been compared to that of Neil Gaiman, Margaret Atwood, China Miéville, and David Mitchell.

Plot 
The story, which takes place primarily in Kolkata, is set during the reign of the Mughal Empire in the seventeenth century and extends to modern India. The main character, Alok Mukherjee, is a college professor and historian who happens upon a stranger that tells him a story about shape-shifters that devour human souls in order to survive. The stranger claims that the tale he tells it true, and although Alok is skeptical, he is intrigued and insists on finishing the story. Alok is then enlisted to translate and transcribe a collection of notebooks and texts documented on human skin, through which the rest of the story is told.

Reception 
The Devourers was shortlisted for the 2015 Shakti Bhatt First Book Prize, the 2015 TATA Live! Literature First Book Award, and the 2016 International Association for the Fantastic in the Arts William L. Crawford Fantasy Award. It was also listed as a 2015 selection for Locus Recommended Reading.

"Not for the squeamish, Das' debut is an ambitious, unsettling trip into our own capacity for violence," according to Kirkus Reviews. Author of The Obelisk Gate, N. K. Jemisin, concluded in her review of the book in The New York Times, ”Readers will savor every bite."

In a starred review, Publishers Weekly praised Das' debut novel as "brutal, intoxicating, and gorgeously visceral." Podcast host and writer for Tor.com Mahvesh Murad described The Devourers similarly and expanded on the sentiment: "It is violent and vicious and deeply unsettling for a number of reasons. But it is also showcases Das’ incredible prowess with language and rhythm, and his ability to weave folklore and ancient legend with modern day loneliness."

References

External links 
 Excerpt of The Devours on Tor.com
 Indrapramit Das's website

2015 Indian novels
Novels about cannibalism
Debut speculative fiction novels
2015 fantasy novels
Werewolf novels
Lambda Literary Award-winning works
2015 debut novels
Penguin Books India books